Ryan Donahue (born March 17, 1988) is a former American football punter.  He was signed by the Lions as an undrafted free agent in 2011. He played college football at Iowa.

Professional career

Detroit Lions
Donahue was placed on injured reserve on November 29, 2011 after suffering a quad injury. He was released by the Lions on August 31, 2012.

References

External links
 Detroit Lions bio
 Iowa Hawkeyes bio

1988 births
Living people
American football punters
Iowa Hawkeyes football players
Detroit Lions players
Players of American football from Illinois